Anopina arizonana is a moth of the family Tortricidae first described by Lord Walsingham in 1884. It is found in North America from southern interior British Columbia and from Waterton Lakes, Alberta, south to Arizona.

The moth is about 16 mm. The forewings are shiny yellow with silvery lines on the basal half and the postmedian area. The hindwings are uniform dark grey.

The larvae possibly feed on dead leaves of Betula and Salix species. The larvae are white with a yellowish-orange to pale-yellow head with a few darker markings.

References

Moths described in 1884
arizonana
Moths of North America